The Red Earth Festival is a Native American cultural festival that takes places every June in Oklahoma City, Oklahoma, United States. Red Earth, Inc. is the nonprofit organization that hosts the festival and maintained the Red Earth Art Center, which houses temporary exhibits and a permanent collection of Native American art in downtown Oklahoma City.

History
The Red Festival was launched in 1987. when art advocates planned a Native art market and powwow. The organization grew out of the Native-run Center of the American Indian, a cultural center and art museum founded in 1978. The two groups merged in 1992 to create Red Earth.

Festival
The festival is a multi-day event each June. The festival features an art market open to Native American members of federally and state-recognized tribes. The festival also features nonprofit and educational booths, demonstrations, and a dance showcase. The event is held at the Grand Casino Hotel Resort, east of downtown Shawnee, Oklahoma.

An estimated 27,000 people attended in 2010.

References

External links 
 Red Earth, Inc., official website

Native American museums in Oklahoma
Native Americans in Oklahoma City
Museums in Oklahoma City
Arts centers in Oklahoma
Festivals in Oklahoma
Native American festivals
Culture of Oklahoma City